Refilwe is a township near the historical town of Cullinan, east of Pretoria in Gauteng Province, South Africa.

References

Populated places in the City of Tshwane
Townships in Gauteng